Highway 247 is a highway in the Canadian province of Saskatchewan. It runs from Highway 47 to Highway 9.

Highway 247 passes through the Crooked Lake Provincial Park and Bird's Point Resort at Round Lake.

Major intersections
From west to east:

References

External links
Crooked Lake Provincial Park

247